The 2019 AFL season was the 123rd season of the Australian Football League (AFL), the highest level senior men's Australian rules football competition in Australia, which was known as the Victorian Football League until 1989. The season featured eighteen clubs, ran from 21 March until 28 September, and comprised a 22-game home-and-away season followed by a finals series featuring the top eight clubs.

The premiership was won by the Richmond Football Club for the twelfth time, after it defeated  by 89 points in the 2019 AFL Grand Final.

Rule changes
There were several alterations to the laws of the game in 2019:
 Starting positions were mandated at centre bounces, with each team required to have six players inside each 50m arc – including one in each goal square – four players in the centre square and two along the wings. A team guilty of the 6-6-6 rule, as it became known, received one warning per game, then conceded a free kick on subsequent infractions.
 At kick-ins after behinds, the full back was no longer required to kick to himself to play on from the goal square, and the man on the mark was positioned 10m from the kick-off line instead of 5m.
 The spot of any mark or free kick received within nine metres of a player's defensive goal line would be brought back to the nine-metre line, rather than remaining at the spot of the mark or free kick.
 Team runners were no longer permitted to enter the playing surface except for the break in play after a goal had been kicked; water carriers were also forbidden from entering during live play.
 The protocol for a 50-metre penalty was amended, allowing the player with the ball to advance to the new mark at his own pace without being interfered with by an opponent (which could be penalised by a second 50-metre penalty), and with the right to play on at any time while the 50m penalty was being measured out. Previously, measuring out a 50m penalty was done with time off.
 The push-in-the-back rule was relaxed, allowing a player to place his hands on the back of his opponent to protect his position in a marking contest, provided he does not push. This removed the more stringent interpretation added in 2007 which saw a free kick to penalised any use of hands on an opponent's back in a marking contest.
 The concept of prior opportunity as it applied to holding the ball was formally defined for the first time as part of a copyedit of the rule. The only change to the intent of the rule was that a ruckman who takes direct possession of the ball in a ruck contest was no longer considered to have had prior opportunity – removing a provision which had existed since 2003.

Pre-season

AFLX

The AFL confirmed in December 2018 that the modified version of the sport, known as AFLX, would return in the 2019 pre-season. Unlike the 2018 competition, no AFL clubs took part in the event, with four all-star teams being picked by four high-profile players: Patrick Dangerfield (captain of the Bolts), Eddie Betts (Deadlys), Nat Fyfe (Flyers) and Jack Riewoldt (Rampage). The tournament occurred at Marvel Stadium, Melbourne on 22 February 2019 and was won by the Rampage.

JLT Community Series

The pre-season series of games returned as the 2019 JLT Community Series, with teams playing two games each. The games were stand-alone, with no overall winner of the series. Each team played two games, many at suburban or regional venues, while all games were televised on Fox Footy.

Premiership season

Notable features of the draw included:

  replacing  in hosting  in Shanghai.
 Tony Ireland Stadium in Townsville hosted an AFL premiership match for the first time, when  played  in round 13. The fixture replaced the game held in Cairns between 2011 and 2018.
  hosted  for the Queen's Birthday match for the first time since 1999.

2019 marked the first year of games being broadcast in 4K resolution, with a total of 46 ultra-high-definition games being shown on Foxtel.

Round 1

Round 2

Round 3

Round 4

Round 5

Round 6

Round 7

Round 8

Round 9

Round 10

Round 11

Round 12

Round 13

Round 14

Round 15

Round 16

Round 17

Round 18

Round 19

Round 20

Round 21

Round 22

Round 23

Win/loss table

Bold – Home game
X – Bye
Opponent for round listed above margin

Ladder

Ladder progression
Numbers highlighted in green indicates the team finished the round inside the top 8.
Numbers highlighted in blue indicates the team finished in first place on the ladder in that round.
Numbers highlighted in red indicates the team finished in last place on the ladder in that round.
Underlined numbers indicates the team had a bye during that round.
Subscript numbers indicate ladder position at round's end.

Positions of teams round by round

Finals series

Week one

Week two

Week three

Week four

Awards

Coleman Medal
Larger numbers indicate number of goals scored in each round. Subscript numbers indicate total cumulative goals scored through that round.
Numbers highlighted in blue indicates the player led the Coleman Medal at the end of that round.
Numbers underlined indicates the player did not play in that round.

Player milestones

Best and fairest

Club leadership

Coach changes

Club membership

References

 
Australian Football League seasons
2019 in Australian rules football